Seiji (written: , , , , , , , , , , , , , , , , , , , , ,  or  in hiragana) is a masculine Japanese given name. Notable people with the name include:

, Japanese ski jumper
, Japanese racing driver
, Japanese politician
, Japanese film director and producer
, Japanese golfer
, Japanese basketball player
, Japanese actor
, Japanese politician
, Japanese rugby union player
, Japanese film director
, Japanese footballer
Seiji Inagaki (born 1973), Japanese hurdler
, Japanese musician and record producer
Seiji Kameyama (亀山 晴児, born 1979), Japanese rapper better known as WISE
, Japanese footballer
, Japanese aviator
, Japanese politician
, Japanese footballer
, Japanese anime director
, Japanese professional baseball player
, Japanese footballer
Seiji Kubo (born 1973), Japanese footballer
, Japanese cross-country skier
, Japanese voice actor
, Japanese photographer
, Japanese politician
, Japanese politician
, Japanese sport wrestler
, Japanese manga artist
, Japanese actor
, Japanese anime director
, Japanese film editor
, Japanese politician
, Japanese sport wrestler
 Seiji Noma (1878–1938), Japanese writer and publisher 
, Japanese biologist
, Japanese volleyball player
Seiji Ono, Japanese table tennis player
, Japanese politician
, Japanese conductor
, Japanese footballer
, Japanese professional wrestler
, Japanese voice actor
, Japanese fencer
, Japanese chemist
, Japanese politician
, Japanese ice hockey player
, Japanese actor
Seiji Takaku, Japanese psychologist
, Japanese television producer
, Japanese painter and artist
, Japanese astronomer
, Japanese ski mountaineer
, Japanese chef
, Japanese composer
, Japanese writer and communist

See also
Celadon, known in Japanese as Seiji (青磁)

Japanese masculine given names